The 2000–01 season was the 90th season in the history of Empoli F.C. and the club's second consecutive season in the second division of Italian football. In addition to the domestic league, Empoli participated in this season's edition of the Coppa Italia.

Players

First-team squad

Pre-season and friendlies

Competitions

Overview

Serie B

League table

Results summary

Results by round

Matches

Source:

Coppa Italia

First round

Statistics

Appearances and goals

|-
! colspan=14 style=background:#DCDCDC; text-align:center| Goalkeepers

|-
! colspan=14 style=background:#DCDCDC; text-align:center| Defenders

|-
! colspan=14 style=background:#DCDCDC; text-align:center| Midfielders

|-
! colspan=14 style=background:#DCDCDC; text-align:center| Forwards

References

Empoli F.C. seasons
Empoli